Senovė (Varėna) is a village in Varėna district municipality, in Alytus County, in southeastern Lithuania. According to the 2021 census, the village has a population of 4 people.

Senovė village is located c.  from Druskininkai,  from Marcinkonys,  from Šklėriai (the nearest settlement),  from the Belarusian border.

References

Villages in Alytus County
Varėna District Municipality